"I'm an Albatraoz" (stylized as "IM AN̓ ALBATRÁOZ") is a 2014 single by Swedish DJ and record producer AronChupa, featuring uncredited vocals from Nora Ekberg, his younger sister, better known by her stage name Little Sis Nora. The song has been certified seven-times platinum in Sweden, quadruple platinum in Canada, triple platinum in Italy, and double platinum in Australia.

In the lyrics of the song, Ekberg describes a woman whom she calls a mouse. The word albatraoz is made-up but refers to the albatross and is also the name of a Swedish electronic group that AronChupa is a member of. The song's use of "mouse" is a play on words, as mus (the Swedish word for "mouse") is also a slang term for vagina.

Music video
The video for the single features Aron Ekberg's younger sister Nora Ekberg. It starts off with the song being introduced by a French announcer, with a black background, and the text "A film by AronChupa" and "In association with Sertac Yildizhan", accompanied by a pianist.

Women are shown doing their makeup and applying perfume in a dressing room and act as backup dancers in their dressing gowns; whilst the video is focused mostly on Nora Ekberg, AronChupa is also shown behind a turntable, with an older drummer nearby; also, saxophone players are featured.

The video was shot at the Paramount Theatre in the city of Oakland, California. Since October 13, 2014, the official music video has over 1.207 billion views on YouTube as of January 2021, making it one of the top 210 most-viewed videos on the site.

Track listing
CD single
 "I'm an Albatraoz" – 
 "I'm an Albatraoz" (Extended version) – 
 "I'm an Albatraoz" (Shortened version) -

Charts

Weekly charts

Year-end charts

Certifications

References

2014 songs
2014 debut singles
Electro swing songs
AronChupa songs
Number-one singles in Denmark
Number-one singles in Sweden